Rupjyoti Kurmi (born 24 July 1977) is an Indian politician from Bharatiya Janata Party. He was a member of Indian National Congress. Kurmi is the strongest tea-tribe leader of Upper Assam. In May 2021, he was elected as a member of the Assam Legislative Assembly from Mariani (constituency). He defeated Ramani Tanti of Bharatiya Janata Party by 2,446 votes in 2021 Assam Assembly election. In June 2021, he was expelled from Indian National Congress due to disagreement of promotion of the youngster in the party and for his anti-party activities. He joined Bharatiya Janata Party in presence of Chief Minister of Assam Himanta Biswa Sarma. He is the son of former cabinet minister, Rupam Kurmi.

References 

Living people
21st-century Indian politicians
People from Jorhat district
Indian National Congress politicians from Assam
Assam MLAs 2021–2026
Members of the Assam Legislative Assembly
Bharatiya Janata Party politicians from Assam
1977 births